"Speed Demon" is a song by American recording artist Michael Jackson from his seventh studio album, Bad. It was written, composed and co-produced by Jackson, and produced by Quincy Jones. "Speed Demon" is a funk rock song whose lyrics pertain to driving fast. The song was released on September 4, 1989, as a promotional single for both the album and the 1988 film Moonwalker. The song received mixed reviews from contemporary critics.

Background
"Speed Demon" was written and co-produced by Michael Jackson, and produced by Quincy Jones. It appears on Jackson's album, Bad. Reportedly the song was originally planned to be released as an official single, but it was instead released as a promotional single. A 7" single was produced to promote the single release of "Speed Demon", as the song had become popular because of its use in the Moonwalker movie (as with "Leave Me Alone"), but the single release of "Speed Demon" was subsequently cancelled. The song's lyrics are about driving fast. According to Jones, Jackson wrote the song after he received a traffic ticket, which caused him to arrive late to the recording studio. Jones told him to write about how he felt, which he did, thereby turning it into a song. Although "Speed Demon" was part of Jackson's Bad album, Jackson did not perform the song during his Bad World Tour, nor any of his other tours. the demo which was recorded the same year as the final version was leaked in LQ in 2020 and a HQ version was leaked in 2023.

The song was remixed by dubstep group Nero for the 25th anniversary of Bad.

Critical reception
"Speed Demon" received mixed reviews from contemporary critics. Davitt Sigerson of Rolling Stone stated that the "filler" content in Bad—including songs such as "Speed Demon", "Dirty Diana" and "Liberian Girl"—made Bad "richer, sexier, and better than Thriller's forgettables". Sigerson described "Speed Demon" as being "the car song"..."a fun little power tale in which Jackson's superego gives his id a ticket". On the other hand, Stephen Thomas Erlewine of AllMusic commented that the "near-fatal dead spot[s] on the record" of "Speed Demon" and "Another Part of Me" represented "a sequence that's utterly faceless, lacking memorable hooks and melodies".

Richard Cromelin of the Los Angeles Times gave Bad a good review. He remarked that the song "Speed Demon" would "zero" audiophiles on the "race car intro-dimensional recording". Eric Snider of the St. Petersburg Times described "Speed Demon" as "churning along relentlessly". Jay Cocks of Time noted that Jackson did great "vocal stunts" on Bad'''s tracks; such as "Speed Demon" and "Dirty Diana" and described the two songs as "nimble and fanciful as any of his dance steps". In his Bad 25 review, BBC Music's Mike Diver wrote that "Speed Demon" was "fun funk-rock that'd sit happily on a Prince album of the period, compositionally if not lyrically."

Music video
Jackson filmed a promotional video for the song in March 1988 at Warner Bros. Studios, Burbank. It is seen first as a segment in the anthology film Moonwalker (1988). Directed by Will Vinton, the video was produced by Vinton, Jerry Kramer, Michael Jackson and Frank Dileo.

As the video begins, Jackson tries to evade overzealous fans and interviewers (including The Noid from Domino's Pizza commercials), disguising himself as a rabbit named Spike. However, as his alter ego, he goads the fans into chasing him. During the chase, he morphs into other celebrities, including Sylvester Stallone, Tina Turner and Pee-wee Herman. After finally losing the mob, he removes the costume, which comes to life and challenges him to a dance-off. As the two finish dancing, a police officer (portrayed by Clancy Brown) approaches and indicates a "No Dancing" sign. Jackson tries to explain the situation, but Spike has vanished. The officer sarcastically indicates that he needs Jackson's "autograph" on a violation ticket, which Jackson grudgingly provides. The officer departs and, as Jackson prepares to do the same, a rocky crag in the distance morphs into Spike's head; Jackson and the rock formation smile at each other.

In his review of Moonwalker, Dennis Hunt of The Los Angeles Times commented that the video (along with those for "Bad" and "Leave Me Alone") was "slick, well-crafted and expensive-looking." He nevertheless felt that the segments were collectively "still just music videos", further stating that they were "not even strung together in any particularly imaginative fashion". In 2010, the long version of the music video was released in the box set Michael Jackson's Vision and again in 2012 in the Target exclusive version DVD of Bad 25, along with eight other music videos, from the Bad era.

Credits and personnel
Credits adapted from the liner notes of Bad''.

 Written and composed by Michael Jackson
 Produced by Quincy Jones
 Co-produced by Michael Jackson
 Michael Jackson: solo and background vocals, vocal synthesizer
 Larry Williams: Midi saxophone solo
 Miko Brando, Ollie E. Brown, John Robinson: drums
 Douglas Getschal: drum programming
 Bill Bottrell, David Williams: guitars
 Kim Hutchcroft: saxophone
 Gary Grant, Jerry Hey: trumpets
 Paulinho da Costa: percussion

 Christopher Currell: Synclavier, effects
 John Barnes, Michael Boddicker, Greg Phillinganes: synthesizers
 Eric Persing: synthesizer programming
 Race car intro:
 Dimensional Recording by Spherical Sound, Inc.
 Sounds engineered by Ken Caillat and Tom Jones
 Rhythm arrangement by Michael Jackson and Quincy Jones
 Vocal arrangements by Michael Jackson
 Synthesizer and horn arrangements by Jerry Hey

References

1987 songs
1989 singles
Epic Records singles
Funk rock songs
Michael Jackson songs
Song recordings produced by Michael Jackson
Song recordings produced by Quincy Jones
Songs about cars
Songs written for films
Songs written by Michael Jackson